Rob Zerban is an entrepreneur, former Kenosha County Supervisor, and Congressional candidate. He is a member of the Democratic Party. Zerban's campaign for the United States House of Representatives in 2012 and 2014 largely focused on protecting Social Security and Medicare, his experience running two businesses, and bringing green industry to Wisconsin's 1st congressional district. Zerban is active in national, state and local politics.

Early life and career
Zerban was born and raised in Belleville, Illinois. He grew up in poverty as the youngest of three children in a single-parent household. Zerban attended the Culinary Institute of America. Zerban founded two food service companies, both of which he later sold.

Zerban moved to Kenosha County in 2004. He would serve two terms as the Kenosha County supervisor from the 2nd district. Zerban served as a member of the board of directors for the Wisconsin League of Conservation Voters campaigning for the Great Lakes Compact. Zerban, and his wife, Dr. Cornelia Zerban frequently protested the union-busting and austerity measures of Wisconsin Governor Scott Walker's political agenda. Zerban currently serves on the executive board of the Wisconsin Business Alliance.

Congressional candidacies
Zerban ran for Congress in 2012 in Wisconsin's 1st congressional district. His opponent was Republican Congressman Paul Ryan, who was simultaneously the Republican nominee for Vice President. Zerban's campaign focused in part on Ryan's Medicare Plan and his experience as a small business owner. Zerban's campaign had success using Reddit's "Ask Me Anything" chats, before such chats had become popular. Ryan won just under 55 percent of the vote, his lowest share in any of his re-election bids. Zerban won Ryan's home county, municipality of residence and voting ward.

Zerban chose to run once more in 2014. He won the Democratic nomination on August 12, 2014, with 25,602 votes (78%) to 7313 votes (22%) for Amar Kaleka. Ryan did not agree to debate Zerban in the 2012 election cycle. It was not until 2014 when the two would be on the same stage. Zerban was defeated in the general election by Congressman Ryan.

Electoral history

References

External links
Project Vote Smart biography
Twitter account
Rob Zerban Profile 

Living people
People from Belleville, Illinois
People from Kenosha County, Wisconsin
Culinary Institute of America alumni
County supervisors in Wisconsin
Wisconsin Democrats
Year of birth missing (living people)